Fabio Sacchi (born 23 May 1974 in Milan) is an Italian former professional road bicycle racer who raced for the , , ,  and  teams.

His name was on the list of doping tests published by the French Senate on 24 July 2013 that were collected during the 1998 Tour de France and found positive for EPO when retested in 2004.

Major results

 Trofeo Città di Borgomanero (2006-with Marco Velo)
 Milano–Torino (2005)
 Volta a Portugal - 1 stage (2004)
 Giro di Romagna (2003)
 Tour Down Under - 1 stage (2001–2003)
 Trofeo Città di Castelfidardo (2002)
 Vuelta a Murcia - 2 stages (2002)
 Gran Premio della Costa Etruschi (2001)
 Coppa Bernocchi (1998)

References

External links 

1974 births
Living people
Italian male cyclists
Cyclists from Milan